Eternitatea is the biggest cemetery in Iași, Romania.

Notable interments
 Vasile Adamachi, philanthropist
 Petre Andrei, sociologist and politician
 Dimitrie Anghel, poet and writer
 Alexandru Bădărău, politician, academic, and journalist
 Sabin Bălașa, painter, writer and director
 Nicolae Beldiceanu, poet and writer
 Vasile Burlă, philologist
 George Matei Cantacuzino, architect
 Eduard Caudella, composer, violinist, conductor, teacher, and music critic
 Otilia Cazimir, writer, poet, translator and publicist
 Mihail Cerchez, general
 Constantin Climescu, mathematician and politician
 Grigore Cobălcescu, geologist and paleontologist
 Mihai Codreanu, poet
 Vasile Conta, philosopher, writer, and minister
 Ion Creangă, writer
 Ioan P. Culianu, religious historian, writer, and essayist
 Mircea David, footballer
 Barbu Ștefănescu Delavrancea, writer, orator, lawyer, and mayor of Bucharest
 Nicolae Gane, writer and politician
 Gheorghe Ghibănescu, historian, genealogist, and philologist
 Markus Glaser, Roman Catholic bishop
 Dimitrie Gusti, sociologist, ethnologist, and historian
 Garabet Ibrăileanu, literary critic and writer
 Mihail Kogălniceanu, lawyer, historian, publicist, and Prime Minister of Romania
 Radu Korne, general
 Lucia Mantu, writer
 Gheorghe Gh. Mârzescu, jurist and mayor of Iași
 Dumitru C. Moruzi, cvil servant and writer
 Gavriil Musicescu, composer, musicologist, and conductor
 Vera Myller, mathematician and professor
 Marija Obrenović, boyaress
 Alexandru A. Philippide, writer and translator
 Vasile Pogor, politician, publicist and poet
 Petru Poni, chemist, physicist, teacher, mineralogist, and politician
 Ștefan Procopiu, physicist, professor and inventor
 Aristizza Romanescu, actress
 Constantin Simirad, politician 
 George Topîrceanu, poet, writer, memoirist, and publicist
 Ștefan Vârgolici, poet, critic, and translator

External links
 
 
 

Cemeteries in Romania
Eastern Orthodox cemeteries
Buildings and structures in Iași
Tourist attractions in Iași